The Buffalo River is a  tidal river northwest of Brunswick, Georgia.  It is part of the Brunswick River network of tidal channels along the Atlantic coast of the U.S. state of Georgia.

See also
List of rivers of Georgia

References 

USGS Hydrologic Unit Map - State of Georgia (1974)

Rivers of Georgia (U.S. state)
Rivers of Glynn County, Georgia